
The expression as the crow flies is an idiom for the most direct path between two points, rather similar to "in a beeline". This meaning is attested from the early 19th century, and appeared in Charles Dickens's 1838 novel Oliver Twist:

Crows do conspicuously fly alone across open country, but neither crows nor bees (as in "beeline") fly in particularly straight lines. While crows do not swoop in the air like swallows or starlings, they often circle above their nests.

One suggested origin of the term is that before modern navigational methods were introduced, cages of crows were kept upon ships and a bird would be released from the crow's nest when required to assist navigation, in the hope that it would fly directly towards land. However, the earliest recorded uses of the term are not nautical in nature, and the crow's nest of a ship is thought to derive from its shape and position rather than its use as a platform for releasing crows. It has also been suggested that crows would not travel well in cages, as they fight if confined.

See also
Distance
Geodesic
Great-circle distance

References

Further reading

External links

 "As the crow flies" The Phrase Finder.
 "As the crow flies" World Wide Words.

English phrases
Navigation
English-language idioms
Metaphors referring to birds
1830s neologisms